Hamsterley Mill is a village in County Durham, around 3 miles from Burnopfield and approximately the same distance from Consett.

Villages in County Durham